Coleophora supinella is a moth of the family Coleophoridae. It is found from Germany, Spain, Italy, Belgium, France, Czech Republic, Slovakia, and Austria. It is also known from Bulgaria.

The wingspan is 12.5-15.5 mm.

The larvae feed on Chamaecytisus supinus and Chamaecytisus austriacus. They feed on the generative organs of their host plant. They create a case.

References

supinella
Moths of Europe
Moths described in 1949